"Daku" is a graffiti artist from Delhi, India. Daku means "bandit" or "dacoit" in Hindi. Active since 2008 in several cities across India, he creates wheat pastes and murals which satirize and protest social and political issues. He is celebrated for his work as "India's Banksy", but he disagrees with the comparison since his art has different styles and message.

Early life
The real identity of Daku is not known. Not much is known about his life. He was possibly born around 1984. He was raised in a small town in Saurashtra, Gujarat. He studied art and worked for an advertising agency before starting graffiti.

Career
2006
Daku was inspired to graffiti in 2006 through Streetfiles - a Berlin based website on the early internet that aimed to compile and organize the "freshest photos of street art & graffiti worldwide and locally." The website accepted artist contributions and Daku wanted to create and add his own.

Since the beginning of his career, Daku has been tagging his name across cities in India using indigenous fonts and typography including Mumbai, Delhi, Ahmedabad and Baroda. 

2008
Daku's first collaboration was with the France-based artist JonOne, one of the founder-members of Crew 156, a group of New York City Subway artists from the 1980s who were in Mumbai in 2008. He also collaborated with two other graffiti artists, Bond and Zine. He started tagging his own name in Devanagari script on walls in Mumbai and South Delhi in 2008 so that he could reach the large Indian demographic that only understand their local language.

2010
Before the 2010 Commonwealth Games in Delhi, he put up several modified stop signs with generic yet inflammatory messages to provoke public reaction. He tagged many garbage bins with Ku Da in Delhi, an anagram of his own name. Additionally, he adorned the walls of garbage dumping grounds with Ku Da, satirizing luxury brands by juxtaposing them against a backdrop of poverty and filth.

2011
He stenciled "fuck" in Hindi across nine places in Mumbai overnight to protest against Vasant Dhoble, the assistant commissioner of police who was accused of moral policing. Dhoble had sparked public outrage because of recordings of him raiding restaurants and pubs citing archaic rules. Daku regularly commented on social issues with his works, such as a stenciled LPG cylinder rocket to highlight price rises and a blindfolded protester during the 2011 Indian anti-corruption movement. In addition to social commentaries, his work also highlighted the mundane. Another collection plastered "fuck" across Mumbai streets inspired by a conversation he had with a taxi driver. When Daku asked, "Do you know what fuck means?", the taxi driver responded, "When a man is worried, he says 'fuck yaar'."

He and other street artists did wall graffiti, commissioned at Buddh International Circuit. With Bond, he created a  graffiti at IIT Bombay TechFest in 2011.

2012
Daku has created street arts with light, shadows and reflections. He first experimented during the Kochi Biennale in 2012 and put mirrors to reflect texts such as "Time Flies" or "Time Travel" on walls, streets and parked vehicles so that they were only visible for a few hours a day, depending on the sun's position. 

2013
An accident at a footbridge in Mehrauli, Delhi, had mangled it beyond usage. After several months passed without repair, Daku painted a "for sale" sign with an asking price of 150 million rupees which was the costs of construction. He said the public should be aware how much of their money is wasted because of government neglect.

He organized India's first-ever street art festival called St+Art in Delhi.

2014
Before the 2014 Indian general election, at F-block, Connaught Place he painted a graffiti Mat Do, a contranym which instructs the viewer both not to give "their vote" as well as "to vote".

2015
His works have been showcased at  venues such as the Centre Pompidou, the Venice Biennale and the Triennale di Milano. He participated in the India Art Fair 2015 and created a -long stenciled mural on asphalt with the repeated slogan, "This is commissioned vandalism". He designed a room in flat of the Indian actor, Hrithik Roshan. He put graffiti on shutters of Hysteria, the music merchandise shop, on Church Street, Bengaluru, in late 2015 for the "Mohan Kaun?" Project.

2016
He installed a shadow art collection in Lodhi Colony, Delhi, in March 2016. He placed billboards across Hyderabad in April 2016 in criticism of consumerism. In October 2016, he pasted giant snail posters across Silicon Valley, Bangaluru, to highlight traffic jams.

2019
He installed a shadow art collection called "Theories of Time" in Panaji, Goa, in 2019. 

2021
In 2021, he created a mural highlighting the water crisis in Chennai.

References

Anonymous artists
Living people
Indian graffiti artists
Pseudonymous artists
Political artists
People from Gujarat
Year of birth missing (living people)
21st-century Indian male artists
Artists from Gujarat